Pigeon Point may refer to:

 Pigeon Point Lighthouse, California
 Pigeon Point, Minnesota
 Pigeon Point, Tobago
 The Pigeon Point neighborhood in Beaufort, South Carolina
 The Pigeon Point neighborhood in Delridge, Seattle